The Office of the Prosecutor General of the Republic of Moldova is a government institution in Moldova, that works within the judicial power. It carries out and promotes observance of the rule of law, justice, protection of the rights and legitimate interests of the individual and society in criminal and other legal proceedings.

History
On 23 July 1812, the authorities of the Russian Empire in Bessarabia laid the foundation for the activities of the prosecutor's office in Bessarabia. In May 1818, a prosecutor was appointed under the provincial government, county prosecutors appeared in the districts and county prosecutors were established, and prosecutors were approved by civil servants. The regional prosecutor’s office existed in Bessarabia until 1859, when the Chisinau district court was created and prosecutors appeared at the district courts and the Court of Appeal. After the October Revolution and the collapse of the Russian Empire, the Moldavian Democratic Republic was formed on the territory of the right-bank part of the Bessarabian province, which lasted less than a year and became part of the Kingdom of Romania. By decree of the King Ferdinand I on 6 October 1918, the prosecutor's supervision is carried out by the prosecutor under the leadership of the Minister of Justice, who was the general prosecutor. After the establishment of Soviet power in Moldova on 2 August 1940, 6 district prosecutor’s offices  were created in the following cities: Balti, Bender, Cahul, Chisinau, Orhei and Soroca. The procedure for the creation and powers of the prosecutor's office were established in accordance with the regulation on 17 December 1933. By decree of the Presidium of the Supreme Soviet of the USSR on 22 June 1941, Moldovan prosecutors were either enlisted in the Red Army or continued to monitor public order, labor discipline, the rights and interests of the military and their families. In the post-war period, the activities of the prosecutor's office were focused on strengthening the rule of law in various fields. In October 1947, the original district prosecutor's offices were liquidated with all city and district prosecutors being directly subordinate to the prosecutor's office of the Moldavian SSR. With the adoption of the Constitution of the USSR (1977) and the Constitution of the Moldavian SSR (1978), the position of the prosecutor's office was significantly strengthened. The modern Office of the Prosecutor General was created via a law adopted on 26 January 1992.

Structure
 Prosecutor General
 Deputy Prosecutor General
 Anti-corruption Prosecutor's Office
 Military Prosecutor
 Office of International Cooperation and European Integration
 Department of International Legal Assistance
 Department of Protocol, International Cooperation and European Integration
 Office of Criminal Prosecution and Forensics
 Division for the unification of criminal prosecution practices
 Anti-trafficking Unit
 Department of Information Technology and the fight against cybercrime
 Torture Unit
 Judicial Administration
 Division for the unification of judicial practice
 Division of Prosecution in the Supreme Court of Justice
 Division for representation in non-criminal proceedings and implementation of the ECHR
 Management of Policies, Reforms and Advocacy
 Department of Policies, Reforms and Project Management
 Department of Investigation of Crimes against the Environment and the Public Interest
 Department of Juvenile Justice
 Department of control over special investigative activities and ensuring the secret regime
 Special Prosecutors
 Department of Personal Data Protection
 Internal Audit Department
 Inspection of prosecutors
 Office of the Attorney General
 Public Relations Department
 Human Resources Department
 Department of the Secretariat, Petitions and Reception
 Financial and administrative management
 Department of Finance and Accounting
 Department of Public Procurement and Logistics

Prosecutor's General
 Semyon Kolesnik (1945-1949)
 Grigory Osipov (1949-1953)
 Akim Kazanir (1953-1970)
 Ivan Cheban (1970-1987)
 Nikolai Demidenko (1987-1990)
 Dmitry Postovan (1990-1998)
 Valery Katane (1998-1999)
 Mircea Yuga (1999-2001)
 Vasily Rusu (2001-2003)
 Valery Balaban (15 December 2003-8 February 2007)
 Valery Gurbulya (8 February 2007-2 October 2009)
 Valery Zubko (7 October 2009-21 January 2013)
 Corneli Gurin (18 April 2013-1 March 2016)
 Eduard Harunjen (8 December 2016-11 July 2019)
 Alexandru Stoianoglo (29 November 2019-5 October 2021)
 Dumitru Robu(acting), from 6 October 2021

Institutions

Supreme Council of Prosecutors
The Supreme Council of Prosecutors is a representative body of self-government under the Prosecutor's Office of Moldova, which consists of 15 members: 6 permanent and 9 elected.

Permanent members include:

Prosecutor General
Prosecutor General of Gagauzia
President of the Supreme Council of Magistracy
Minister of Justice of Moldova
Human Rights Ombudsman
President of the Bar Association of Moldova

5 members are elected by secret, direct and free ballot: 1 from the Prosecutor's Office, 4 from territorial and specialized prosecutor's offices and 4 more member on a competitive basis by proposal from the following: the President of Moldova, Parliament of Moldova, Academy of Sciences and the Government of Moldova.

General Assembly of Prosecutors
The General Assembly of Prosecutors is an advisory body to the Prosecutor's Office. It consists of prosecutors of cities and regions of Moldova on a rotational basis, elected by the Supreme Council of Prosecutors.

References

External links
 Official website
 General Prosecutor’s presentation page 

Law enforcement in Moldova
Law of Moldova
Prosecution